Sacred Heart Hospital of Manchester, New Hampshire was founded in 1892.  It was located at 177 Amherst Street.  It became Catholic Medical Center East in 1974. The building was closed in 1979.

References 

Defunct hospitals in New Hampshire
Hospitals established in 1892
1892 establishments in New Hampshire
1974 disestablishments in New Hampshire